Mitch Versteeg (born November 3, 1988) is a Canadian professional ice hockey defenceman. He is currently an unrestricted free agent who most recently played for the Idaho Steelheads in the ECHL.

Playing career
Versteeg played major junior hockey with the Lethbridge Hurricanes of the Western Hockey League, scoring 12 goals and 29 assists for 41 points, and earning 297 penalty minutes, in 148 games played.

Versteeg began his professional career with the 2009–10 season, playing the majority of the season in the ECHL with the Kalamazoo Wings, but also playing three games in the American Hockey League with the Worcester Sharks. He was a member of 2010–11 Kalamazoo Wings Eastern Conference Championship team.

On July 25, 2013, the Heilbronner Falken of Germany's of the 2nd Bundesliga signed Versteeg for the 2013–14 season. In August 2014, Versteeg signed a contract with the Nikkō Ice Bucks of the ALH.

After 8 seasons abroad, Versteeg opted to return to North America, agreeing to a contract for the 2021–22 season with the Idaho Steelheads of the ECHL on November 10, 2021.

Family
He is the younger brother of two time Stanley Cup champion Kris Versteeg.

References

External links

1988 births
Living people
Canadian ice hockey defencemen
Canadian people of Dutch descent
Drumheller Dragons players
Heilbronner EC players
Ice hockey people from Alberta
Idaho Steelheads (ECHL) players
Kalamazoo Wings (ECHL) players
Lethbridge Hurricanes players
Nikkō Ice Bucks players
HK Nitra players
Rote Teufel Bad Nauheim players
Sportspeople from Lethbridge
Trenton Titans players
Worcester Sharks players
Canadian expatriate ice hockey players in Germany
Canadian expatriate ice hockey players in Japan
Canadian expatriate ice hockey players in Slovakia
Canadian expatriate ice hockey players in the United States
Canadian expatriate ice hockey players in Hungary